Armen Mazmanyan (15 February 1960 – 8 January 2014) was a theater director and actor from Armenia. He was rector of the Yerevan State Institute of Theater and Cinema (YSITC).

References

External links
Armen Mazmanyan's biography

1960 births
2014 deaths
21st-century Armenian male actors
Male actors from Yerevan
20th-century Armenian male actors
Armenian male stage actors
Academic staff of the Yerevan State Institute of Theatre and Cinematography